Panamanhattan is a live album by bassist Ron Carter and accordionist Richard Galliano recorded in Paris in 1990 and released on the Dreyfus Jazz label.

Reception

The AllMusic review by Michael Erlewine said "the free-reed sound of the accordion on this recording is both subtle and lovely. Tempos range from ballads to medium, but tend to be on the slow side. Not breakthrough jazz, these duets (recorded live, in concert) are refreshing and what all good music should be, just good listening".

Track listing 
All compositions by Richard Galliano except where noted
 "Summer in Central Park" (Horace Silver) – 5:40
 "Spleen" – 7:03
 "Doom" (Ron Carter) – 4:48
 "Allée des Brouillards" – 3:33
 "A Small Ballad" (Carter) – 5:38
 "Portrait Of Jennie" (J. Russel Robinson, Gordon Burdge) – 7:33
 "Ballade pour Marion" – 4:19
 "Little Waltz" (Carter) – 7:24
 "Des Voiliers" – 4:09

Personnel 
Ron Carter - bass 
Richard Galliano – accordion

References 

Ron Carter live albums
Richard Galliano live albums
1991 live albums
Dreyfus Records live albums